The Metallica Blacklist is a various artists tribute album featuring covers of every track from Metallica's 1991 self-titled album (commonly known as The Black Album). The collection was assembled in conjunction with the original album's 30th anniversary. Most of the songs are covered multiple times, with 53 artists participating. The album was released in digital formats on September 10, 2021, and in physical formats on October 1, 2021.

Background 
The Metallica Blacklist tribute album is part of a larger celebration of the 30th anniversary of The Black Album, and was released on the same day as a deluxe remastered version of the original album. The tribute album was envisioned as an illustration of how The Black Album influenced musicians from many different genres, and was inspired by the existence of several previous tributes to the album, by artists in genres ranging from electronica to classical.

In preparation for the project, Metallica invited some musicians who had gained notice for covering other Metallica songs in the past, such as the Warning, the Hu, and Rodrigo y Gabriela. Metallica then invited artists from a variety of genres to contribute unique interpretations of the songs. The invited artists were permitted to choose which song to cover. According to a statement made by the band, "The Metallica Blacklist offers up new dimensions of the record whose gravitational pull first drew the mainstream to Metallica – and provides new insights into the universal and timeless appeal that kept it there: the boundary-smashing influence these 12 songs have had on fans and musicians of all stripes."

For each song on the album, half of the proceeds are donated to Metallica's All Within My Hands Foundation, and the other half are donated to a charity of that artist's choice.

Reception 

At Metacritic, which assigns a normalised rating out of 100 to reviews from professional publications, the album has an average score of 66 based on 10 reviews, indicating "generally favorable reviews". The album received reviews that were generally favorable toward the project's wide variety of genres and often surprising selection of contributors, but with some qualms about its repetitive or inconsistent nature as a listening experience. Metal Hammer noted that there are too many versions of some songs, especially "Enter Sandman" and "Nothing Else Matters", but concluded that the tribute album "underscores how, unlike any other band in history, Metallica have transcended heavy metal and emerged as one of music's greatest cultural exports." Metal Hammer also endeavored to rank all 53 songs on the album, concluding that the best is the version of "Nothing Else Matters" by Miley Cyrus, who was supported by Elton John, Yo-Yo Ma, Andrew Watt, Chad Smith, and current Metallica bassist Robert Trujillo.

Pitchfork also gave the album a mixed review, calling it "enormous and uneven" and criticizing some predictable covers by the hard rock and heavy metal artists, but praising genre-jumping contributions like those by Japanese-British pop singer Rina Sawayama and Ghanaian-American musician Moses Sumney. Rolling Stone made note of some of the more eclectic covers, such as the contributions from jazz musician Kamasi Washington and punk rock supergroup Off! In a separate review, Rolling Stone concluded that the album is a fitting tribute to the ongoing influence of The Black Album.

Exclaim! also noted that not all of the 53 songs are fully satisfying, but praised the project for its contributions to charity while ranking Washington's version of "My Friend of Misery" as the album's best track. Metal Injection called the album "a complete reimagining of one of the most iconic records of all time." NME called it "a fitfully thrilling hodgepodge" that forces the listener to choose their own favorite version of each song, but concluded that the album is "a fantastic tribute to one of metal's sacred texts."

Track listing

Charts

References 

2021 compilation albums
Metallica tribute albums